William Keith (26 November 1925 – 5 September 1999) was a South African long-distance runner. He competed in the marathon at the 1952 Summer Olympics.

References

1925 births
1999 deaths
Athletes (track and field) at the 1952 Summer Olympics
South African male long-distance runners
South African male marathon runners
Olympic athletes of South Africa
People from Nketoana Local Municipality